The 1973 football season was São Paulo's 44th season since club's existence.

Statistics

Scorers

Overall

{|class="wikitable"
|-
|Games played || 81 (22 Campeonato Paulista, 40 Campeonato Brasileiro, 19 Friendly match)
|-
|Games won || 29 (6 Campeonato Paulista, 17 Campeonato Brasileiro, 6 Friendly match)
|-
|Games drawn || 36 (9 Campeonato Paulista, 18 Campeonato Brasileiro, 9 Friendly match)
|-
|Games lost || 16 (7 Campeonato Paulista, 5 Campeonato Brasileiro, 4 Friendly match)
|-
|Goals scored || 86
|-
|Goals conceded || 59
|-
|Goal difference || +27
|-
|Best result || 1–3 (A) v Botafogo - Campeonato Paulista - 1973.0.22
|-
|Worst result || 4–1 (A) v Portuguesa Santista - Friendly match - 1973.03.01 4–1 (A) v Moto Club - Campeonato Brasileiro - 1973.10.03 4–1 (H) v Internacional - Campeonato Brasileiro - 1974.02.13
|-
|Most appearances || 
|-
|Top scorer || Pedro Rocha (21)
|-

Friendlies

Torneio Laudo Natel

Taça Estado de São Paulo

Official competitions

Campeonato Paulista

Record

Campeonato Brasileiro

Record

External links
official website 

Association football clubs 1973 season
1973
1973 in Brazilian football